Pionosyllis serratisetosa is a polychaete from the family Syllidae. The body of the worm exists as a head, a cylindrical, segmented body ending in a tail. The head consists of a prostomium and peristomium and a pair of appendages (palp, antennae and cirri).

Pionosyllis serratisetosa was first described by Lòpez, San Martín & Jiménez.

References

 Musco, L., Bellan, G. (2010). Pionosyllis serratisetosa Lòpez, San Martín & Jiménez, 1997. In: Fauchald, K. (Ed) (2010). World Polychaeta database.
 http://www.marinespecies.org/aphia.php?p=taxdetails&id=131358

Syllidae
Animals described in 1997